Hrachya Keshishyan (born 15 August 1970) is an Armenian film director and producer, winner of numerous international awards.

Biography 
Keshishyan was born on 15 August 1970 in Yerevan, the capital of Armenia.

From 1990–1993 he worked as a director for Armenian State TV and Radio Committee. 

From 1993–1998 he was the head of TV Programs Unit of Information and Propaganda Department at Ministry of Defence. 

From 1996–2000 he was the Art 13 TV general producer, then in 1999–2010 general producer of Armenia 1 and Nor Alik. 

From 1999–2011 Keshishyan produced and directed many TV programs and shows at Armenian Public TV and Nor Alik, such as "Late Night", "Rubicon", "The First Wave Cafe", "The First Program", "National Music Channel", "News on National Music Channel", "Musical Post", "Fashion", "Open project", "Foreign games", "Resolution", "Europolis", "Top 10", "Hot 10", "Two Stars", "Benefis", "Saturday Evering", and "Song of Songs". 

In 1999 he was the general producer of Armenian National TV.

In 2001 he was the general producer of Armenian Public TV.

From 2003–2011 he produced Armenian National Music Awards and from 2006–2008 was the producer for the contestants from Armenia at the Eurovision Song Contest.

In 2004 he was the head of the general producer of Nor Alik.

In 2009 he was the head of the ATV Television Company.

In 2010 he was the chief advisor to the President of Public Council of TV and Radio of Armenia.

In 2012 he was the CEO and general producer of Armenia TV.

In 2015 he was the CEO and general producer of Armnews TV.

Film director

Producer

Screenwriter 
 Nothing Will Stay (2007)

Awards 
Hrachya Keshishian is a winner of numerous local and international awards for his films and music videos.

In 2011 Hrachya Keshishyan was awarded the Movses Khorenatsi Medal.
Honored Culture Figure of the Republic of Armenia, 2018.

External links 
 AV Production – ՀՐԱՉՅԱ ՔԵՇԻՇՅԱՆ
 

1970 births
Armenian film directors
Living people